Duncan Island (36LA60,61) is a prehistoric archaeological site located in the Susquehanna River at Martic Township in Lancaster County, Pennsylvania. It underwent study in the 1950s and 1970s.  Artifacts dated to the Archaic period (c. 8000 B.C. to 1000 A.D.) were uncovered.

Duncan's Island, was settled & owned by Descendants of King Duncan l & King Duncan ll of Scotland, line of John Duncan & Family of Scottish Royalty, many incl Andrew, Charles & relocating to Huntington, Cambria County, Pa including the Clark Duncan kin folk

It was listed on the National Register of Historic Places in 1984.

References

External links

Archaeological sites on the National Register of Historic Places in Pennsylvania
Archaeological sites in Lancaster County, Pennsylvania
National Register of Historic Places in Lancaster County, Pennsylvania